Gabriel Arcand (born June 4, 1949) is a Canadian actor. He is the brother of film director Denys Arcand.

After studying philosophy at McGill University, Arcand spent his formative professional years at La Criée in Marseilles, France, and later in Poland where he studied theatre. Since he made his 1973 screen debut in his brother's first feature, La Maudite Galette, he established himself as Quebec’s iconic strong, silent type and has given subtle but powerful performances in a wide range of films such as Réjeanne Padovani, Les Plouffe, Le Crime d’Ovide Plouffe, Le Déclin de l’empire américain, Post Mortem and Congorama.

He won the Academy of Canadian Cinema and Television's award for Best Actor at the 6th Genie Awards in 1985 for his performance in The Crime of Ovide Plouffe (Le Crime d'Ovide Plouffe) and at the 2nd Canadian Screen Awards in 2014 for The Dismantling (Le Démantèlement), and the award for Best Supporting Actor at the 8th Genie Awards in 1987 for Decline of the American Empire. He was also nominated for Best Actor at the 3rd Genie Awards in 1982 for Les Plouffe and at the 20th Genie Awards for Post Mortem, and for Best Supporting Actor at the 2nd Genie Awards in 1981 for Suzanne and at the 20th Genie Awards in 1999 for Le Grand serpent du monde.

Filmography

 Dirty Money (La Maudite galette) - 1972
 Réjeanne Padovani - 1973
 Gina - 1974
 Little Tougas (Ti-Cul Tougas) - 1975
 Let's Talk About Love (Parlez-nous d'amour) - 1975
 The Machine Age (L'Âge de la machine) - 1977
 Panic (Panique) (1977)
 Bye, See You Monday (Au revoir à lundi) - 1979
 Suzanne - 1980
 The Coffin Affair (L'Affaire coffin) - 1980
 The Plouffe Family (Les Plouffe) - 1981
 Thunder Drum (Mémoire battante) - 1983
 Empire, Inc. - 1983
 The Crime of Ovide Plouffe (Le Crime d'Ovide Plouffe) - 1984
 Agnes of God - 1985
 The Decline of the American Empire (Le Déclin de l'empire américain) - 1986
 The Heat Line (La Ligne de chaleur) - 1987
 The Revolving Doors (Les Portes tournantes) - 1988
 Unfaithful Mornings (Les Matins infidèles) - 1988
 L'air de rien - 1989
 Nelligan - 1991
 Blood of the Hunter - 1995
 The Big Snake of the World (Le Grand serpent du monde) - 1999
 Post Mortem - 1999
 Una Casa con Vista al Mar - 2001
 Chaos and Desire (La Turbulence des fluides) - 2002
 Jean Moulin, une affaire française - 2003
 Folle embellie - 2004
 Congorama - 2006
 Mommy Is at the Hairdresser's (Maman est chez le coiffeur) - 2008
 Karakara - 2012
 The Bossé Empire (L'Empire Bo$$é) - 2012
 The Dismantling (Le Démantèlement) - 2013
 A Kid (Le Fils de Jean) - 2016
 Maria Chapdelaine - 2021

References

External links

1949 births
Living people
Canadian male film actors
Best Supporting Actor Genie and Canadian Screen Award winners
Male actors from Quebec
Best Actor Genie and Canadian Screen Award winners
20th-century Canadian male actors
21st-century Canadian male actors
Canadian male television actors
Best Actor Jutra and Iris Award winners
Best Supporting Actor Jutra and Iris Award winners